Mostafa Al Zenary  (born 9 April 1999) is an Egyptian professional footballer who plays as a centre-back for Egyptian Premier League club Zamalek.

References

Egyptian footballers
Living people
1999 births
Zamalek SC players
Ismaily SC players
Haras El Hodoud SC players
Egyptian Premier League players
Association football defenders